Yellow is a 2006 film directed by Alfredo De Villa and starring Roselyn Sanchez, Bill Duke, and D. B. Sweeney.

Plot synopsis
The film follows the life of Amarillys Campos (Sanchez), a classically trained Puerto Rican dancer who moves to New York City after her father's suicide to pursue her dreams of becoming a famous dancer, but ends up becoming a stripper at a seedy nightclub to make ends meet. Upon her arrival to New York, she moves into a ratty apartment and becomes close with her neighbor, Miles, a former professor of poetry at New York University who currently works at a supermarket due to the fact that he has become mentally unstable. While working as a stripper, she meets a lonely doctor Christian Kyle (Sweeney) who feels the need to protect her, and the two begin a relationship. When the doctor proposes that they move to Australia, Amarillys must decide between her lifelong desire to be a famous dancer, mending a relationship with her family back in Puerto Rico, and taking a chance with her new love.

Cast
 Roselyn Sanchez - Amarillys 
 Bill Duke - Miles Emory
 D. B. Sweeney - Christian Kyle

External links

2006 films
2000s romantic musical films
American dance films
American romantic musical films
American romantic drama films
American musical drama films
2000s English-language films
2000s Spanish-language films
2006 multilingual films
American multilingual films
Films directed by Alfredo De Villa
2000s American films